Oleksandr Varvanin (born 1 May 1997) is a Ukrainian football defender.

Career
Varvanin is a product of the FC Olimpik Donetsk youth sports school system. From 2014 he played in the Ukrainian Premier League Reserves, but never made his debut for the main squad team in the Ukrainian Premier League. In January 2017, Varvanin signed a three-year contract with FC Krumkachy, of the Belarusian Premier League.

After one season at Krumkachy, Varvanin left the team. Between 2018 and 2020 he played in Donetsk and Luhansk-based amateur leagues.

References

External links
 
 

1997 births
Living people
People from Horlivka
Ukrainian footballers
Association football defenders
Ukrainian expatriate footballers
Expatriate footballers in Belarus
Ukrainian expatriate sportspeople in Belarus
FC Olimpik Donetsk players
FC Krumkachy Minsk players
FC Orsha players
FC Arsenal Dzerzhinsk players
Sportspeople from Donetsk Oblast